Bridge is an album by J-pop girlband Speed, released on November 27, 2003. This album was released as part of the "Save the Children" charity project in 2003. It contains their new singles Be My Love and Walking In the Rain/Stars to Shine Again. The album is unique in that it is produced by different artists, not just their main producer: this leads some people to believe it doesn't sound like an album: however, not many people are aware it is produced by different top performers and producers.

Track listing
 "Be My Love"
 "Stars to Shine Again" Produced by Tommy february6.
 "Cryin'"
 "Walking in the Rain" Produced by The Gospellers.
 "Need Your Hands Tonight"
 "Way To Go!" Produced by Tsunku.
 "Bridge to Heaven" 
 "Kiss": Produced by Chara.
 ""
 "Still Blowing:"
 ""
 ""
 "With..."

Speed (Japanese band) albums
2003 albums